Nuspirit Helsinki is a musical collective from Finland. The group was conceived in 1998 by Tuomas Kallio and Hannu Nieminen. Their eponymous debut was released in 2002 via the Guidance Recordings imprint. In 2008, the group released Our Favorite Things. Nuspirit Helsinki, no longer active as a band, now serves as an umbrella for other projects.

The work of the group has been remixed by various artists including Jazzanova and Jori Hulkkonen.

Collaborators 
 Chuck Perkins
 Ona Kamu
 Lisa Shaw
 Kasio
 Kim Rantala
 Nicole Willis

Discography 
 Nuspirit Helsinki (2002)
 Our Favorite Things (2008)

References

External links 
 – official site

Musical collectives
Finnish jazz ensembles